Miguel Soares may refer to:
Miguel Soares (East Timorese footballer) (born 1984), East Timorese footballer
Miguel Soares (Portuguese footballer) (born 1993), Portuguese footballer